Court of special jurisdiction is one level of the court system in China. The courts under this jurisdiction includes:

 Military courts
 Railway transport courts
 Maritime courts
 Shanghai Financial Court
 Beijing Intellectual Property Court
 Shanghai Intellectual Property Court
 Guangzhou Intellectual Property Court
 Hangzhou Internet Court

See also 
 Special jurisdiction

Judiciary of China